Manuel R. Torres is a Spanish researcher known for his work on political violence, jihadist terrorism, and cyber security.

Education 
Torres has a degree in Political Science and Sociology from the University of Granada. In 2008, he presented his PhD thesis focused on Jihadist terrorism, when there was still high tension after 9/11.

Works 
He has participated in numerous national and international research works. He has written several books, and has numerous publications in magazines and chapter collaborations with other books.

In his book Disinformation, the effect of disinformation on different policy areas is analysed.

Torres is a lecturer in the Department of Political Science and Administration at the Universidad Pablo de Olavide in Seville, and also directs several masters and specialisations.

He is a member of the European Counter-Terrorism Centre (Europol) and sits on the academic board of several organisations in the security field.

Publications 

 El Eco del Terror. Ideología y propaganda en el terrorismo yihadista. Plaza y Valdés, Madrid, 2009. 
 Al Andalus 2.0. La ciber-yihad contra España. Biblioteca GESI, Granada, 2014.
 Desinformación. Poder y Manipulación en la Era Digital. Comares, Granada, 2019.

Awards 

 Primer Premio Nacional de Fin de Carrera en Ciencia Política (2002).
 Award "Francisco Moreno" de la Armada Española (2005)
 Award Defensa de Investigación (2008)
 Award Research Real Maestranza de Caballería de Sevilla – Universidad Pablo de Olavide (2010)
 Bronze Medal to police merit with blue badge for the cuerpo de Mossos d'Esquadra-Policia de la Generalitat (2015)
 Distinction by the Institute for Strategic Research of Armada de México (2018)

References 

 
Living people
Investigative journalists
Year of birth missing (living people)
Date of birth missing (living people)